Germaine Montero (1909–2000) was a French singer and a stage, television and film actress.

Partial filmography

 Sapho (1934) - Madame Sombreuse
 The Sin of Rogelia Sanchez (1940) - Rogelia Sanchez
 Saint Rogelia (1940) - Rogelia
 Le soleil a toujours raison (1943) - Georgia
 Casimir (1950) - Angelita Garcia y Gonzalez
 Lady Paname (1950) - Mary-Flor - une chanteuse finie mais capricieuse
 Operation Magali (1953) - Magali
 Knave of Hearts (1954) - Marcelle
 La bella Otero (1954) - Singer (Danse Danse)
 Thirteen at the Table (1955) - Consuelo Koukouwski
 Don Juan (1956)
 Dangerous Games (1958) - Mme Leroy-Gomez
 Le Masque de fer (1962) - Ann d'Autriche
 The Merry Widow (1962) - Anna, Wirtin von "Chez Anna"
 Any Number Can Win (1963) - Mme Verlot
 Dis-moi qui tuer (1965) - Mme Fayard
 The Game Is Over (1966) - Guest
 Caïn de nulle part (1970) - La mère
 L'homme qui vient de la nuit (1971) - Mama Angelo
 Jean Vilar, une belle vie (1972) - Herself
 Une saison dans la vie d'Emmanuel (1973) - La grand-mère
 Le chant du départ (1975) - Mme Lebris
 Robert et Robert (1978) - Mme Goldman
 The South (1983) - Doña Rosario
 Stress (1984) - Madame D'Ambray

References

Bibliography
 Conway, Kelley. Chanteuse in the City: The Realist Singer in French Film. University of California Press, 2004.

External links

1909 births
2000 deaths
French television actresses
French film actresses
French stage actresses
Actresses from Paris
Chevaliers of the Légion d'honneur
Commandeurs of the Ordre des Arts et des Lettres
20th-century French actresses